was the 31st Emperor of Japan, according to the traditional order of succession.

Yōmei's reign spanned the years from 585 until his death in 587.

Traditional narrative
He was called  in the Kojiki. He acceded to the throne after the death of his half brother, Emperor Bidatsu.

The influential courtiers from Emperor Bidatsu's reign, Mononobe no Moriya, also known as Mononobe Yuge no  Moriya no Muraji or as Ō-muraji Yuge no Moriya, and Soga no Umako no Sukune, both remained in their positions during the reign of Emperor Yōmei. Umako was the son of Soga Iname no Sukune, and therefore, he would have been one of Emperor Yōmei's cousins.

Shortly thereafter, Emperor Yōmei is said to have acceded to the throne.

Yōmei's contemporary title would not have been tennō, as most historians believe this title was not introduced until the reigns of Emperor Tenmu and Empress Jitō. Rather, it was presumably , meaning "the great king who rules all under heaven".

Emperor Yōmei's reign lasted only two years; and he died at the age of 46 or 47.

 587, in the 4th month: Yōmei died and his body was placed in a coffin, but not buried.
 587, in the 5th month: Armed conflict over the succession erupted.  Shintoist, anti-Buddhist forces of Yuge no  Moriya no Muraji (also known as Ō-muraji Yuge no Moriya) battled unsuccessfully against the pro-Buddhist forces of Prince Shōtoku and Soga Umako no Sukune.  The opposition to Buddhism was entirely destroyed.
 587, in the 7th month: The body of former Emperor Yōmei was buried.

Because of the brevity of his reign, Emperor Yōmei was not responsible for any radical changes in policy, but his support of Buddhism created tension with supporters of Shinto who opposed its introduction. According to Nihon Shoki, Emperor Yomei believed both in Buddhism and Shinto. Moriya, the most influential supporter of Shinto, conspired with Emperor Yōmei's brother, Prince Anahobe, and after Emperor Yomei's death they made an abortive attempt to seize the throne. Although Emperor Yōmei is reported to have died from illness, this incident and the brevity of his reign have led some to speculate that he was actually assassinated by Moriya and Prince Anahobe.

The actual site of Yōmei's grave is known. The Emperor is traditionally venerated at a memorial Shinto shrine (misasagi) at Osaka.

The Imperial Household Agency designates this location as Yōmei's mausoleum. It is formally named Kōchi no Shinaga no hara no misasagi.

Genealogy
Emperor Yōmei was the fourth son of Emperor Kinmei and his mother was Empress Hirohime, a daughter of Soga no Iname.

In 586, Emperor Yōmei took his half-sister , whose mother was another of Iname's daughters, Soga no Oane Hime, as his consort. Princess Hashihito no Anahobe bore him four sons.

Empress (Kōgō): , Emperor Kinmei's daughter
Second Son: , later Prince Shōtoku, regent to Empress Suiko
Fourth Son: 
Fifth Son: 
Sixth Son: 

Concubine (Hin): , Soga no Iname's daughter
First Son: 

Consort (Hi): , Katsuragi no Atahe's daughter
Third Son: 

Yomei had three Empresses and seven Imperial sons and daughters.

Ancestry

See also
 Emperor of Japan
 List of Emperors of Japan
 Imperial cult

Notes

References
 Aston, William George. (1896).  Nihongi: Chronicles of Japan from the Earliest Times to A.D. 697. London: Kegan Paul, Trench, Trubner. 
 Brown, Delmer M. and Ichirō Ishida, eds. (1979).  Gukanshō: The Future and the Past. Berkeley: University of California Press. ; 
 Ponsonby-Fane, Richard Arthur Brabazon. (1959).  The Imperial House of Japan. Kyoto: Ponsonby Memorial Society. 
 Titsingh, Isaac. (1834). Nihon Ōdai Ichiran; ou,  Annales des empereurs du Japon.  Paris: Royal Asiatic Society, Oriental Translation Fund of Great Britain and Ireland. 
 Varley, H. Paul. (1980).  Jinnō Shōtōki: A Chronicle of Gods and Sovereigns. New York: Columbia University Press. ; 

 
 

Japanese emperors
518 births
587 deaths
People of Asuka-period Japan
Buddhism in the Asuka period
6th-century monarchs in Asia
6th-century Japanese monarchs